Luigi Michelacci (23 July 1879 in Meldola – 19 February 1959 in Florence) was an Italian painter. He painted rural and village scenes, often using only earthy colors.

Biography
He moved to Florence in 1891 with his family and studied under Giovanni Fattori. During his career, he lived in Venice, Paris, and Milan. He was named Correspondent professor of Painting at the Academy of Fine Arts, Florence.

References

1879 births
1959 deaths
19th-century Italian painters
Italian male painters
20th-century Italian painters
Painters from Florence
Academic staff of the Accademia di Belle Arti di Firenze
19th-century Italian male artists
20th-century Italian male artists